Hannah's Law is a 2012 American/Canadian Western television film from the Hallmark Movie Channel. The movie stars Cameron Bancroft, Sara Canning, John Pyper-Ferguson, and Julian Black Antelope.

Synopsis 
The film is centered on the character Hannah Beaumont. The film begins in 1866 Abilene, Texas. The opening scene shows Hannah's parents and young brother being killed by the McMurphy gang. Later in the film, Hannah is a grown woman and a bounty hunter. She has taken an interest in finding the McMurphy gang members who brutally murdered her family. Unlike her fellow bounty hunter competitors, Hannah likes to bring the people she captures in alive so they can face justice. 
She eventually faces the McMurphy gang and learns her brother is actually alive.

Cast 
 Cameron Bancroft as James Beaumont
 Julian Black Antelope as Redwing
 Sara Canning as Hannah Beaumont
 John Pyper-Ferguson as Frank McMurphy
 Tom Carey as Hacker
 Diego Diablo Del Mar as Pineda
 Kimberly Elise as Mary "Stagecoach Mary"
 John Fasano as Marshal Deger
 Brendan Fletcher as Zechariah Stitch
 Danny Glover as Isom Dart
 Lucy Harvey as Elizabeth
 Greyston Holt as Wyatt Earp
 Brendan Hunter as Loring Stewart
 Chris Ippolito as Drunk Cowboy
 Ryan Kennedy as John "Doc" Holliday
 Ian Kilburn as "Turk" Anderson
 Billy Zane as Lockwood

Reception 
Neil Genzlinger of The New York Times called it "a tasty western tale" with no mailed-in performances.  Laura Fries of Variety wrote, "A clear attempt at an action-romance Western, the resulting pic is more like Fifty Shades of Dust."

References

External links
 
 

2012 television films
2012 Western (genre) films
Canadian television films
Cultural depictions of Doc Holliday
Cultural depictions of Wyatt Earp
English-language Canadian films
Films directed by Rachel Talalay
Films set in Texas
Films with screenplays by John Fasano
Hallmark Channel original films
American Western (genre) television films
2012 films
2010s English-language films
2010s Canadian films
Canadian Western (genre) films